The Ingauni were a Celto-Ligurian tribe dwelling on the Mediterranean coast, around the modern city of Albenga (Liguria), during the Iron Age and the Roman period.

Name 

They are mentioned as Ingauni by Livy (late 1st c. BC), Ingaunoi (”Iγγαυνοι) by Strabo (early 1st c. AD), and as Ingaunis by Pliny (1st c. AD).

A Celtic etymology has been suggested by Patrizia de Bernardo Stempel, who derives the name Ingauni from *Pingāmnī (‘the painted ones'), with loss of initial p-, which would be semantically comparable to the ethnonym Picti (Picts). According to her, such linguistically Celtic tribal names suggest that a Celto-Ligurian dialect played an important role among the languages spoken in ancient Ligury.

The modern city of Albenga, attested as oppidum Album Ingaunum by Pliny and as Albingaunum by Strabo, is named after the Ligurian tribe.

Geography 
The Ingauni lived on the Mediterranean coast, around Album Ingaunum (modern Albenga) and Lucus Bormani (Diano Marina). Their territory was located east of the Intimilii, and south of the Epanterii.

Their chief town was known as Album Igaunum or Albingaunum.

History

Punic War 
By the 3rd century BC, the prosperity of thriving Ligurian coastal centres led to recurrent conflicts with mountainous tribes conducting raids on their richer neighbours. During the Second Punic War (218–201 BC), Mago Barca made an alliance in 205 BC with the Ingauni to secure a foothold on the Italian coast. He helped them in their fight against the Epanterii, who lived above them on the hills and raided their territory. He had previously destroyed the Ingaunian rival Genoa, thus allowing them to potentially become the dominant force on the northwestern coast of Italy. Fearing that Mago may unite Gauls and Ligurians against them, the Romans reacted by sending troops to the region and defeated Mago and its allies. In 201 BC, the Roman consul Publius Aelius Paetus signed a peace treaty with the Ingauni to secure the part of the trading route they controlled between Iberia, Massalia and Rome.

Roman conquest 
In 185 BC, a consular army led by Appius Claudius Pulcher was sent against the Ingauni, capturing six of their oppida and, as an example to the vanquished or a deterrent to other Ligurians, he had forty-three Ingauni accused of being responsible for the war beheaded. Only three years later, however, the Massaliotes complained again to Rome about Ligurian piracy, and the consul Lucius Aemilius Paullus was asked by the Senate to bring definite peace on both sea and land. Seeking to avoid a complete destruction of the Ingauni, which could have led to a coastal frontier vacuum potentially filled by less acculturated Alpine tribes, Paullus initially entered the Ingaunian territory to demand their surrender. The Igaunian leaders then feinted to request a delay to consult their fellow tribesmen, using the respite to mass their troops and besiege Paullus' camp, but the consul eventually succeeded in subjugating the Ingauni and received triumph in 181 BC. Although Paullus prohibited the Ingauni from erecting ramparts around their towns to hinder their defensive capabilities, he also left them in control of their piece of coastal land for them to act as sentinels on the Ligurian route.

In 180 BC, the consul Aulus Postumius Albinus, after vanquishing the nearby mountain Ligurians, felt the need to send ships to reconnoiter the shores of the Ingauni and Intemelii, which suggests that they were still considered by Rome a potentially hostile tribe at that time.

References

Primary sources

Bibliography 

 

 
 

Ligures
Tribes conquered by Rome